Hydrophilus triangularis, known generally as the giant black water beetle or giant water scavenger, is a species of water scavenger beetle in the family Hydrophilidae. It is the most common and widespread species of Hydrophilus in North America, being found across the contiguous United States, southern Canada, and Mexico.

References

External links

 

Hydrophilinae
Articles created by Qbugbot
Beetles described in 1823